Jiabei (Chiabei, literly "Chia north", meaning "north of Chiayi") is a railway station of the Taiwan Railways Administration West Coast line located in East District, Chiayi City, Taiwan.

History
The train station was opened on 8 September 2005.

See also
 List of railway stations in Taiwan

2005 establishments in Taiwan
East District, Chiayi
Railway stations opened in 2005
Railway stations in Chiayi
Railway stations served by Taiwan Railways Administration